"Hail to the King" is a song by American heavy metal band Avenged Sevenfold and the lead single from their sixth studio album of the same name, released on July 15, 2013. The song was premiered live on July 17, 2013, at the Ford Festival Park in Oshkosh, Wisconsin.

Release
The song was released on July 15, 2013, as the lead single for their sixth studio album, Hail to the King. On July 31, 2013, a limited edition CD version of the single was released, with a live version of "Nightmare" performed at The Palace of Auburn Hills attached.

Appearances in media
The song appears in the video game Rock Band 4 and as one of the official theme songs for WrestleMania 32.

Music video
The official music video premiered on the Metal Hammer website on August 16, 2013. The video depicts the band playing together, as well as shots of the king referenced in the song. The video is in black and white and is the first to feature drummer Arin Ilejay, as well as being the first Avenged Sevenfold video to feature a drummer since the video for "So Far Away", which contained archive footage of late drummer The Rev.

Accolades

Loudwire Music Awards

|-
| 2013 || Hail to the King || Best Rock Song || 

Revolver Golden Gods Awards

|-
| 2014 || Hail to the King || Song of the Year ||

Track listing

Charts

Weekly charts

Year-end charts

Certifications

Personnel
M. Shadows – lead vocals
Zacky Vengeance – rhythm guitar, backing vocals
Synyster Gates – lead guitar, backing vocals
Johnny Christ – bass guitar
Arin Ilejay – drums

References

External links

Avenged Sevenfold songs
2013 songs
2013 singles
Warner Records singles
Song recordings produced by Mike Elizondo